Mangeli-ye Sofla (also Romanized as Mangelī-ye Soflá; also known as Aḩmadābād Mangelī, Aḩmadābād-e Mangelīābād-e Pā’īn, Aḩmadābād Mangelī Pā’īn, Aḩmadābād Mangelī-ye Pā’īn, and Mangalī-ye Pā’īn) is a village in Safiabad Rural District, Bam and Safiabad District, Esfarayen County, North Khorasan Province, Iran. At the 2006 census, its population was 59, in 10 families.

References 

Populated places in Esfarayen County